Hypersonic Technology Vehicle 2 (HTV-2) is an experimental hypersonic glide vehicle developed as part of the DARPA Falcon Project designed to fly in the Mach 20 range. It is a test bed for technologies to provide the United States with the capability to reach any target in the world within one hour (Prompt Global Strike) using an unmanned hypersonic bomber aircraft.

Development
The Falcon HTV-1 program, which preceded the Falcon HTV-2 program, was conducted in April, 2010. The mission ended within nine minutes from launch. Both these missions are funded by the US Defense Advanced Research Projects Agency (DARPA) to help develop hypersonic technologies and to demonstrate its effectiveness. Under the original plan, HTV-1 was to feature a hypersonic lift-to-drag ratio of 2.5, increasing to 3.5-4 for the HTV-2 and 4-5 for the HTV-3. The actual lift-to-drag ratio of HTV-2 was estimated to be 2.6.

HTV-2 was to lead to the development of an HTV-3X vehicle, known as Blackswift, which would have formed the basis for deployment around 2025 of a reusable Hypersonic Cruise Vehicle, an unmanned aircraft capable of taking off from a conventional runway with a 5,400 kg (12,000 lb) payload to strike targets 16,650 km away in under 2 hours. The HCV would have required a lift-to-drag ratio of 6-7 at Mach 10 and 130,000 ft (40,000m).

Design

Development of protection structures that are tough and lightweight, development of an aerodynamic shape that has a high lift to drag ratio, development of automatic navigation control systems etc. were some of the initial technical challenges that had been overcome in the final design. The various departments involved in designing the vehicle included aerothermodynamics, materials science, hypersonic navigation, guidance and control systems, endo- and exo-atmospheric flight dynamics, telemetry and range safety analysis. The craft could cover , the distance between London and Sydney, in 49 minutes.

Built by Lockheed Martin, the HTV-2 is made of carbon composite material; the durability of such material was needed to prevent important internal components from being destroyed because they are a few inches from its surface.

Flight testing

Both flights reached Mach 20 (high-hypersonic speed) and lost telemetry at 9 minutes of a planned 30-minute mission.

The HTV-2's first flight was launched on 22 April 2010. The flight plan called for the craft to separate from the launch vehicle, level out and glide above the Pacific at Mach 20. Contact was lost with the vehicle at nine minutes into the 30-minute mission, and the glider's skin disintegrated. In mid-November, DARPA stated that the first test flight ended when the computer autopilot "commanded flight termination" after the vehicle began to roll violently.

A second flight was initially scheduled to be launched on August 10, 2011, but bad weather forced a delay.  The flight was launched the following day, on 11 August 2011. The unmanned Falcon HTV-2 successfully separated from the booster and entered the mission's glide phase, but again lost contact with control about nine minutes into its planned 30-minute Mach 20 glide flight. Initial reports indicated it purposely impacted the Pacific Ocean along its planned flight path as a safety precaution. The glider's surface reached  (the speed and heat caused part of the skin to peel away from the aerostructure) and controlled itself for 3 minutes before crashing.

Future development

DARPA does not plan to conduct a third flight test of the HTV-2.  The decision was made because substantial data was collected from the first two flights, and a third was not thought likely to provide any additional valuable data for the cost.  The first flight provided data in aerodynamics and flight performance, while the second provided information about structures and high temperatures.  Experience gained from the HTV-2 will be used to improve hypersonic flight.

Work on the HTV-2 will continue to Summer 2014 to capture technology lessons and improve design tools and methods for high-temperature composite aeroshells.

See also

 Tactical Boost Glide – follow-on project
 DF-ZF – a similar Chinese system that is currently operational.
 Avangard – a similar Russian system that joined service in 2020. 
 Boeing X-51 - scramjet-powered hypersonic cruise missile demonstrator
 Hypersonic Technology Demonstrator Vehicle - scramjet-powered hypersonic cruise missile demonstrator

References

External links
 Falcon page on Darpa.mil
 HCV page on Globalsecurity.org
 "Air Drops Dummy Rocket for Darpa's Falcon", Aviation Week,
 "Hypersonics Back in the News" on Defensetech.org
 "Going Hypersonic: Flying FALCON for Defense" and "Air Force Plans Flight Tests Of Hypersonic Vehicle" on Space.com
 Death of HTV explained

Hypersonic aircraft
DARPA projects
DARPA vehicles